Hymns is the 1986 studio album by 2nd Chapter of Acts.

Track listing 
From Discogs.
 "All Creatures of Our God and King" – 2:58
 "My Jesus I Love Thee" – 4:52
 "Great Is Thy Faithfulness" (Thomas Chisholm, William M. Runyan) – 4:04
 "Joyful, Joyful, We Adore Thee" – 2:40
 "Crown Him With Many Crowns" – 3:46
 "Take My Life And Let It Be" – 1:45
 "Holy, Holy, Holy" – 5:38
 "Fairest Lord Jesus" – 3:47
 "Oh the Deep, Deep Love of Jesus" – 4:08
 "How Great Thou Art" (Stuart K. Hine) – 5:22
 "He Has Formed Me" (Annie Herring) – 1:39

Personnel 

2nd Chapter of Acts
 Annie Herring – vocals, vocal arrangements 
 Nelly Greisen – vocals, vocal arrangements 
 Matthew Ward – vocals, vocal arrangements

Musicians
 John Andrew Schreiner – keyboards, instrumental arrangements 
 Will McFarland – guitar (8)
 Lee Jones – bass
 Dennis Holt – drums

Production
 Buck Herring – producer, engineer at Easter Song Studios, Garden Valley, Texas 
 Greg Hunt – engineer
 Bernie Grundman – mastering at Bernie Grundman Mastering, Hollywood, California
 Buddy Owens – art direction, cover concept 
 Marty Justice – back cover artwork 
 Bradley Grose – design
 Michael Stevens – calligraphy 
 Michael Going – photography

References

1986 albums
2nd Chapter of Acts albums